Duckmanton North Junction is a former railway junction near Arkwright Town in Derbyshire, England.

Context
Duckmanton North Junction was one of four interrelated junctions built by the GCR to connect its main line to the LD&ECR's main line when it took the latter company over in 1907. The junctions are usually referred to collectively as "Duckmanton Junction" or occasionally as "Duckmanton Junctions."

Description
The four junctions operated interactively, so they are described together in the article Duckmanton Junction to which the reader is referred.

External links
 Arkwright Town Junction on navigable 1947 O.S. map

Rail junctions in England
Rail transport in Derbyshire
Lancashire, Derbyshire and East Coast Railway structures